The Depretis III government of Italy held office from 19 December 1878 until 14 July 1879, a total of 207 days, or 6 months and 25 days.

Government parties
The government was composed by the following parties:

Composition

References

Italian governments
1878 establishments in Italy